Dean Hagopian is a Canadian actor, former radio personality and musician, voice actor and record producer. Starting in the 1960s, Hagopian worked at numerous radio stations including CKOY in Ottawa, CFOX, where he worked the morning shift in 1967 and CJFM in Montreal. Before that, he was a member of the musical group The Staccatos, who later became The Five Man Electrical Band. Hagopian produced the first album made by the music group Rabble.

References

External links

 

Canadian radio personalities
Canadian rock musicians
21st-century Canadian male actors
Possibly living people
Year of birth missing
Canadian male voice actors